The Battle of Potrero Obella was a battle between a Paraguayan Army of 300 against 5,000 Brazilians. Although the Paraguayans took heavy losses, they inflicted 395 casualties (85 killed, 310 wounded) on the Brazilians.

Brazilian Gen. Barreto was sent from Villa del Pillar to capture Tayi on the River Paraguay, and Potrero Ovello on 27 October 1867.  This would enable a Brazilian blockade of the Paraguayan garrisons.  After their defeat on 28 Oct., the surviving Paraguayans made their way back to Humaita.

References

Conflicts in 1867
Battles of the Paraguayan War
Battles involving Paraguay
Battles involving Brazil
October 1867 events
1867 in Paraguay